New Mexico State Road 28 (NM 28) is a  paved, two-lane state highway in Doña Ana County, in the U.S. state of New Mexico. It travels south-to-north roughly paralleling the Rio Grande.

The southern terminus of NM 28 is at the Texas state line west of Canutillo where Farm to Market Road 259 (FM 259; Canutillo La Union Avenue) ends. The northern terminus is in Las Cruces where it intersects NM 478. It also has an interchange with Interstate 10 (I-10) in Las Cruces, shortly before its terminus.

Route description
The highway begins west of Canutillo at the New Mexico - Texas state line where Texas FM 259 highway ends. It continues west-northwest for approximately  before turning mostly north following the Rio Grande on the west side. NM 28 passes through agricultural communities of the Mesilla Valley such as La Union, Anthony, Vado, Chamberino and La Mesa. The highway passes through a multitude of fields, dairy farms, vineyards, and pecan orchards. After  the road crosses the Rio Grande over a  bridge, built in 1989, and continues on to Mesilla. After passing through downtown Mesilla as Avenida de Mesilla, NM 28 turns northeast and at  the highway crosses Interstate 10. NM 28 then continues northeast for another  until its end at the junction with NM 478.

History
NM 28 was originally created in 1905 by the Territorial Legislative Assembly, and in 1909 it was designated as State Road 28 by the Territorial Roads Commission. After New Mexico attained statehood in 1912, the newly created State Highway Commission redesignated NM 28 as an official state highway. Originally the north terminus of the highway was at intersection with Route 1 in Mesquite. In mid-1930s the highway was extended all the way to Las Cruces. Between mid-1940s and mid-1960s NM 28 was lengthened all the way to US 80/US 85 in Doña Ana and Radium Springs. By late 1960s the highway's northern terminus was shifted back to Las Cruces.

New Mexico governor Bill Richardson originally requested the State Transportation Commission to consider renaming NM 28 as the Lou Henson Highway. Reynold E. Romero, General Counsel for the Department of Transportation, appeared before the State Transportation Commission on February 17, 2005, and requested Commission approval of Resolution 2005-02, dedicating State Highway 28 from Las Cruces to Sunland Park as the Lou Henson Highway. The State Transportation Commission approved the resolution to name the southern New Mexico highway after Lou Henson, a retired New Mexico State University basketball coach. Governor Bill Richardson dedicated the historic highway on March 30, 2005, as the Lou Henson Highway, in recognition of the coach.

Major intersections

See also

References

External links

28
Transportation in Doña Ana County, New Mexico